{

Inquisitor zonata is a species of sea snail, a marine gastropod mollusk in the family Pseudomelatomidae, the turrids and allies.

G.W. Tryon considered this species to be a synonym of Clathrodrillia flavidula (Lamarck, 1822)

Description

Distribution
This marine species occurs off Singapore and in the China Seas.

References

 Liu J.Y. [Ruiyu] (ed.). (2008). Checklist of marine biota of China seas. China Science Press. 1267 pp.

External links
 

zonata
Gastropods described in 1843